Đắk R'lấp is a rural district (huyện) of Đắk Nông province in the Central Highlands region of Vietnam. As of 2017 the district had a population of 88,329. The district covers an area of 635,67 km² (In 2007, Đắk R'lấp district was divided into 2 districts: Tuy Đức and Đắk R'lấp). The district capital lies at Kiến Đức.

Đắk R'lấp district includes 1 town and 10 communes: 

Kiến Đức (town), Nhân Cơ, Đăk Wer, Kiến Thành, Đạo Nghĩa, Nghĩa Thắng, Nhân Đạo, Đăk Sin, Quảng Tín, Hưng Bình and Đăk Ru (communes).

References

Districts of Đắk Nông province